The Rockaway Borough Public Schools are a community public school district that serves students in pre-kindergarten through eighth grade from Rockaway Borough, in Morris County, New Jersey, United States.

As of the 2020–21 school year, the district, comprised of two schools, had an enrollment of 515 students and 52.8 classroom teachers (on an FTE basis), for a student–teacher ratio of 9.8:1.

The district is classified by the New Jersey Department of Education as being in District Factor Group "FG", the fourth-highest of eight groupings. District Factor Groups organize districts statewide to allow comparison by common socioeconomic characteristics of the local districts. From lowest socioeconomic status to highest, the categories are A, B, CD, DE, FG, GH, I and J.

Public school students in ninth through twelfth grades attend Morris Hills High School (located in Rockaway Borough), which also serves students from Wharton and some from Rockaway Township (the White Meadow Lake section and other southern portions of the township).  Morris Knolls High School serves all students from Denville (where the school is located) and most students from Rockaway Township (with the exception of White Meadow Lake and other areas in the southern part of the township). The Academy for Mathematics, Science, and Engineering, a magnet high school program that is part of the Morris County Vocational School District is jointly operated on the Morris Hills campus. The two high schools are part of the Morris Hills Regional High School District. As of the 2020–21 school year, the high school had an enrollment of 1,218 students and 119.7 classroom teachers (on an FTE basis), for a student–teacher ratio of 10.2:1.

Schools
Schools in the district (with 2020–21 enrollment data from the National Center for Education Statistics) are:
Elementary school
Lincoln Elementary School with 223 students in grades PreK-3
Milissa Dachisen, Principal
Middle school
Thomas Jefferson Middle School with 283 students in grades 4-8
David Waxman, Principal

Administration
Core members of the district's administration are:
Anthony Grieco, Superintendent
William Stepka, Business Administrator / Board Secretary

Board of education
The district's board of education is comprised of five members who set policy and oversee the fiscal and educational operation of the district through its administration. As a Type II school district, the board's trustees are elected directly by voters to serve three-year terms of office on a staggered basis, with either one or two seats up for election each year held (since 2015) as part of the November general election. The board appoints a superintendent to oversee the district's day-to-day operations and a business administrator to supervise the business functions of the district.

References

External links
Rockaway Borough Public Schools
 
Rockaway Borough Public Schools, National Center for Education Statistics

New Jersey District Factor Group FG
Rockaway, New Jersey
School districts in Morris County, New Jersey